Municipal elections were held in San Diego in 2020 for mayor, city attorney, and city council. The primary election occurred Tuesday, March 3, 2020, and the general election occurred Tuesday, November 3, 2020. Five of the nine council seats were contested. No council incumbents stood for reelection.

Municipal elections in California are officially non-partisan, although most members do identify a party preference. A two-round system was used for the elections, starting with primaries in March followed by runoff elections in November between the top-two candidates in each race.

Mayor

City Attorney

City Council

Seats in San Diego City Council districts 1, 3, 5, 7, and 9 were up for election. Incumbents Mark Kersey (District 5) and Scott Sherman (District 7) were ineligible to run for reelection due to term limits. The other three incumbent council members chose to run for higher office rather than seek reelection: Barbara Bry (District 1) for mayor of San Diego, Chris Ward (District 3) for California's 78th State Assembly district, and Georgette Gómez (District 9) for California's 53rd congressional district.

District 1 
District 1 consists of the communities of Carmel Valley, Del Mar Mesa, Del Mar Heights, La Jolla, Pacific Highlands Ranch, Torrey Hills, Torrey Pines, and University City. No Republican candidates contested the race.

District 3 
District 3 consists of the communities of Balboa Park, Bankers Hill/Park West, Downtown San Diego, Golden Hill, Hillcrest, Little Italy, Mission Hills, Normal Heights, North Park, Old Town, South Park, and University Heights.

District 5 
District 5 consists of the neighborhoods of Black Mountain Ranch, Carmel Mountain Ranch, Miramar, Rancho Bernardo, Rancho Encantada, Rancho Peñasquitos, Sabre Springs, San Pasqual Valley, Scripps Ranch, and Torrey Highlands.

District 7 
District 7 consists of the neighborhoods of Allied Gardens, Del Cerro, Grantville, Linda Vista, Mission Valley, San Carlos, Serra Mesa, and Tierrasanta.

District 9 
District 9 consists of the communities of Alvarado Estates, City Heights, College Area, College View Estates, El Cerrito, Kensington, Mountain View, Mount Hope, Rolando, Southcrest, and Talmadge.

Council President
At their first meeting on December 10, 2020, the newly seated City Council selected Jen Campbell to serve as the Council President on a 5-4 vote. The other four council members supported Monica Montgomery Steppe.

Ballot Measures

Polling

Primary Election
Measure C in the primary was distinct from Measure C in the General Election. The first of these did not pass.

Measure C

On whether to raise taxes to pay for the expansion of the San Diego convention centre (Measure C fit this building)

General Election
Measure A

Measure B

Measure C

Measure E

Notes

References

External links 

 Voter Pamphlets and Election Results by Election Date (from 1970 forward)
 Propositions: Ballot Questions and Results by Decade (from 1900 forward)

San Diego
San Diego
2020
2020s in San Diego